The COVID-19 pandemicpandemic was confirmed to have reached South America on 26 February 2020 when Brazil confirmed a case in São Paulo. By 3 April, all countries and territories in South America had recorded at least one case.

On 13 May 2020, it was reported that Latin America and the Caribbean had reported over 400,000 cases of COVID-19 infection with, 23,091 deaths. On 22 May 2020, citing the rapid increase of infections in Brazil, the World Health OrganizationWHO declared South America the epicentre of the pandemic.

As of 12 January 2023, South America had recorded 67,331,547 confirmed cases and 1,344,031 deaths from COVID-19. Due to a shortage of testing and medical facilities, it is believed that the outbreak is far larger than the official numbers show.

Statistics by country and territory

South America and Latin America

Timeline by country and territory

Argentina

Bolivia

Brazil

Chile

Colombia

Ecuador 

On 29 February 2020, the Minister of Health in Ecuador, Catalina Andramuño, confirmed the first case of the virus in the country. The patient, a woman in her 70s, Ecuadorian citizen who resides in Spain, had arrived to Guayaquil on 14 February.

On 1 March 2020, Andramuño announced that five new cases of coronavirus have been confirmed in Ecuador.

As of 31 March 2020, there have been 2240 confirmed cases, plus 75 deaths linked to COVID-19. The Health Ministry also reported 61 deaths probably related to COVID-19.

Ecuador was described in April 2020 as emerging as the "epicentre" of the pandemic in Latin America. The Guayas Province was particularly strongly affected, with thousand of excess deaths reported compared to the figure for a normal period. It was reported on 17 April 2020 that 10,939 people had died in six weeks since the start of March in the Guayas Province, compared to a normal figure of 3,000 for the province.

Falkland Islands

On 3 April 2020, the British Overseas Territory of the Falkland Islands confirmed its first case on 3 April 2020. Furthermore, as a precaution, the islands' government has closed all schools and nurseries until 4 May.
As of 30 April, all 13 cases have recovered.

French Guiana

On 4 March 2020, the first 5 cases were found the French overseas department and region of French Guiana, and the first death was announced on 20 April 2020.

Guyana

Paraguay

On 7 March the first confirmed case in Paraguay was announced, a 32-year-old Paraguayan who arrived from Ecuador.

On 10 March, Paraguay suspended public school sessions and large-scale public events for 15 days due to the coronavirus.

On 13 March, Paraguay suspended flights coming from Europe.

Peru

Suriname

On 13 March 2020, Vice President Ashwin Adhin announced the first confirmed case in the country.

On 3 April, the first death was announced.

On 3 May, all remaining COVID-19 cases recovered.

On 18 May, an eleventh case was identified.

On 11 August, President Santokhi announced a series of measures requiring the use of face masks, reducing operating practices of restaurants, and prohibiting groups of 5 or people from gathering except for work, education, religious gatherings and funerals. A national curfew would be in place from 21:00 to 5:00 everyday until 23 August.

Uruguay

Venezuela 

On 13 March, Vice President Delcy Rodríguez announced the first two confirmed cases in the country.

On 14 March, Communication Minister Jorge Rodríguez informed that eight new cases were detected in the country.

On 26 March, the first death was reported.

Diosdado Cabello, vice-president of the United Socialist Party of Venezuela and president of the pro-government Constituent National Assembly announced he tested positive for COVID-19 on 9 July.

Tareck El Aissami, the Minister of Petroleum and Omar Prieto, the Governor of Zulia also tested positive on 10 July.

A member of the 2017 National Constituent Assembly and the Governor of the Capital District, Darío Vivas tested positive for COVID-19 on 19 July.

Venezuela Minister of Communication and Information Jorge Rodríguez tested positive for COVID-19 on 13 August. On the same day, Darío Vivas died of COVID-19 at the age of 70.

Venezuela is particularly vulnerable to the wider effects of the pandemic because of its ongoing socioeconomic and political crisis causing massive shortages of food staples and basic necessities, including medical supplies. The mass emigration of Venezuelan doctors has also caused chronic staff shortages in hospitals.

Prevention in other countries and territories

South Georgia and the South Sandwich Islands
This remote territory is uninhabited, save for small communities of scientists; the territory is also occasionally visited by small groups of tourists. On 17 March tourist facilities in Grytviken were closed as a precaution, with various other measures being implemented to protect workers on the islands. South Georgia is open for visitors with a permit and is still virus free as of 22 April.

Notes

References

External links 

 Corona MAP – Daily updated interactive free map of the whole world. 
 Coronavirus Timeline Map – Maps the timeline of the Coronavirus infections, deaths and recoveries.
 Epidemic data for COVID-19 – Maps total cases of coronavirus in the world, China and the United States, along with patient data.
 Coronavirus COVID-19 Global Cases and historical data by Johns Hopkins University
 CoronaMapper – Map with several updated statistics
 Coronavirus Updates  – Daily updated totals of South America

 
South America
Health disasters in South America
2020 disasters in South America
2021 disasters in South America